Enver Marić (born 16 April 1948) is a Bosnian former professional football goalkeeper and retired football manager.

Club career
He started his career playing for FK Velež Mostar from 1967 to 1976, for who he played a record 600 games in his nine-year stint. Marić then went on to play for German club FC Schalke 04 from 1976 to 1978 and the Yugoslavia national team at the 1974 FIFA World Cup.

Marić is also remembered for being the part of the Velež three known as the "Mostar BMV" (Bajević, Marić and Vladić) during the 1960s, 1970s and 1980s.

International career
He made his debut for Yugoslavia in an April 1972 European Championship qualification match against the Soviet Union and has earned a total of 32 caps, scoring no goals. His final international was a May 1976 European Championship qualification match away against Wales.

Managerial career
He returned to football as a manager, managing Velež from 1987 to 1990, then working as a goalkeeping coach at Fortuna Düsseldorf from 1993 to 1998 and Hertha BSC from 1998 to 2010. For a short stint in 1998, Marić was the caretaker manager of Düsseldorf. During 1999, he worked as a goalkeeping coach in the Bosnia and Herzegovina national team.

Personal life
On 7 October 2010, Marić suffered a stroke in his home in Berlin, Germany.

Honours

Player
Velež Mostar
Yugoslav Cup: 1980–81
Balkans Cup: 1980–81

Individual
Awards
Yugoslav Footballer of the Year: 1973

References

External links

Enver Marić at Soccerway

1948 births
Living people
Sportspeople from Mostar
Association football goalkeepers
Yugoslav footballers
Yugoslavia international footballers
1974 FIFA World Cup players
UEFA Euro 1976 players
FK Velež Mostar players
FC Schalke 04 players
Yugoslav First League players
Bundesliga players
Yugoslav expatriate footballers
Expatriate footballers in Germany
Yugoslav expatriate sportspeople in Germany
Yugoslav football managers
Bosnia and Herzegovina football managers
FK Velež Mostar managers
Fortuna Düsseldorf managers
Yugoslav First League managers
2. Bundesliga managers
Association football goalkeeping coaches
Bosnia and Herzegovina expatriate football managers
Expatriate football managers in Germany